Suzaan van Biljon (born 26 April 1988 in Bloemfontein, South Africa) is an Olympic-swimmer from South Africa. She swam for South Africa at the 2008 and 2012 Olympics, and as of June 2009 holds both African and South African records.  She holds the African record for the long course 200 m breaststroke, set at the 2012 Summer Olympics, and the short course records in the 100 and 200 m breaststroke.

Her brother, Pite, is an international cricketer who has represented the South Africa cricket team.

Affiliations
TuksSport - University of Pretoria, South Africa

References

External links
  Van Biljon rounds off a successful season

1988 births
Living people
South African people of British descent
Sportspeople from Bloemfontein
South African female swimmers
University of Pretoria alumni
Female breaststroke swimmers
Swimmers at the 2008 Summer Olympics
Swimmers at the 2012 Summer Olympics
Olympic swimmers of South Africa
Swimmers at the 2006 Commonwealth Games
Commonwealth Games bronze medallists for South Africa
South African people of Dutch descent
Afrikaner people
Medalists at the FINA World Swimming Championships (25 m)
Commonwealth Games medallists in swimming
African Games gold medalists for South Africa
African Games medalists in swimming
African Games bronze medalists for South Africa
Competitors at the 2007 All-Africa Games
Competitors at the 2011 All-Africa Games
20th-century South African women
21st-century South African women
Medallists at the 2006 Commonwealth Games